, born , was the wife of Prince Morihiro Higashikuni and eldest daughter of Emperor Shōwa and Empress Kōjun. She was the eldest sister to Japan's emperor emeritus, Akihito.

Biography
Princess Shigeko was born at Akasaka Palace in Tokyo while her father was still Prince Regent for her grandfather the Taishō Emperor. As was the practice of the time, she was not raised by her biological parents after the age of three, but by a succession of court ladies at a separate palace built for her and her younger sisters in the Marunouchi district of Tokyo from 1930. Emperor Shōwa opposed the move, but could not defy court tradition. She entered the girls elementary department of the Gakushūin Peer's School in 1932 and completed the secondary department in 1942, learning cooking and literature.

In 1941, she was formally engaged to the eldest son and heir of Prince Naruhiko Higashikuni, Prince Morihiro Higashikuni. The bride and groom were double first cousins once removed, through both the main imperial line, in descent from Emperor Meiji (the bride's maternal grandfather and the groom's father were siblings; meaning that the groom was a first cousin of the bride's father), and through collateral imperial lines, or ōke, that were cadet branches of the Fushimi-no-miya cadet branch of the imperial house. The couple were officially wed on 10 October 1943. As the wedding occurred in the middle of World War II, ceremonies and expenses were kept to a minimum, and she wore a junihitoe kimono belonging to her mother, Empress Kōjun, rather than having special clothing created for the occasion.

In 1947, the Higashikunis were reduced to commoner status with the abolition of titles of nobility by the American occupation forces. With rampant post-war inflation, high taxation, and various failed business ventures by her husband, the Higashikuni family was reduced to poverty. In January 1958, she accepted an offer by the Japanese national television network, NHK, to appear before a live audience and explain the New Year's poetry card reading contest and other royal ceremonies. She fell ill in 1960, complaining of stomach pains, and was diagnosed with cancer. Hospitalized at the Imperial Household Agency Hospital in Tokyo, she died on 23 July 1961. Her grave is at the Toshimagaoka imperial cemetery in Bunkyo, Tokyo.

Family

Shigeko and Morihiro had five children, the last three of whom were born after they were reduced in status to commoners:

  (10 March 1945 – 20 March 2019); married Miss Shimada Yoshiko in 1973, and had one son, Higashikuni Masahiko (b. 1973)
 ; married Mr. Omura Kazutoshi.
 : adopted by the Mibu family as "Mibu Motohiro"
 ; married to Ms. Sato Kazuko, with two sons, Teruhiko and Mutsuhiko
  Married.

Honours

National honours
 Grand Cordon of the Order of the Precious Crown

Ancestry

Portrayals in the media
Princess Shigeko was a featured protagonist in the 2022 alternative history novel Hydrogen Wars: Atomic Sunrise by R.M. Christianson and its upcoming sequel Hydrogen Wars: Atomic Winter.

Gallery

References

External links

Time Magazine, September 26, 1927

Japanese princesses
Higashikuni-no-miya
1925 births
1961 deaths
Deaths from stomach cancer
Deaths from cancer in Japan
People from Tokyo

Grand Cordons (Imperial Family) of the Order of the Precious Crown
Daughters of emperors